Required for meiotic nuclear division 5 homolog B (S. cerevisiae), also known as RMND5B, is a protein which in humans is encoded by the RMND5B gene.

Protein sequence

This protein is rich in leucine (14.0%) and might belong to the protein family of leucine-rich repeats
        1 meqcacvere ldkvlqkflt ygqhcersle ellhyvgqlr aelasaalqg tplsatlslv
       61 msqccrkikd tvqklasdhk dihssvsrvg kaidrnfdse icgvvsdavw dareqqqqil
      121 qmaivehlyq qgmlsvaeel cqestlnvdl dfkqpfleln rilealheqd lgpalewavs
      181 hrqrllelns slefklhrlh firllaggpa kqlealsyar hfqpfarlhq reiqvmmgsl
      241 vylrlgleks pychlldssh waeicetftr dacsllglsv esplsvsfas gcvalpvlmn
      301 ikavieqrqc tgvwnhkdel pieielgmkc wyhsvfacpi lrqqtsdsnp piklicghvi
      361 srdalnklin ggklkcpycp meqnpadgkr iif

Homology

CAD28476 is highly conserved in many eukaryotic organism. Its high conservation suggests that it plays a primary role in meiosis.

Orthologs

Zinc finger domain 

Two domains  were predicted by the program BLIMPS to exist in the protein of which one of the domains contains a zinc finger domain.

Zinc finger domains assist the binding of the protein to nucleic acids. This points to a direct interaction of CAD28476 with DNA during meiosis.  By comparing CAD28476 with a related zinc finger protein in a local sequence alignment using LALIGN, the amino acids His359, Cys381 and Cys384 could be attributed to the zinc finger domain.  This zinc finger structure is uncommon in the way that it involves one histidine instead of two.

Expression 
Microarray data show that CAD28476 is highly expressed in tissue where meiosis occurs like in testis and ovaries. Moreover, it is also highly expressed in the brain around the hypothalamus.

Transcriptional regulation 

The analysis of the promoter region (tools on the page rVista . were used) shows that there are several transcription factor binding sites localized in conserved regions . 
It is very likely that the transcription factor Ets-1 which belongs to the ETS transcription factor family and its core binding factor CBF are involved in regulation of transcription since they both have independent binding sites.

Interacting proteins 
There were two proteins predicted which interact with CAD28476.

References

Further reading